"Necio" (English: "Foolish") is a song by American singer Romeo Santos, featuring Mexican guitarist Carlos Santana, from his second studio album Formula, Vol. 2 (2014).

Chart performance

Certifications

References

2014 songs
Romeo Santos songs
Carlos Santana songs
Santana (band) songs
Songs written by Romeo Santos
Spanish-language songs